Godfrey John Boyle Chetwynd, 8th Viscount Chetwynd, CH (3 October 1863 – 22 March 1936) was a British peer and industrialist, a member of the House of Lords from 1911 until his death. 

Chetwynd was the second son of Captain Henry Weyland Chetwynd (1829–1893; the third son of the 6th Viscount Chetwynd) and his wife Julia Bosville Davidson (d. 1901; a maternal granddaughter of the 3rd Baron Macdonald of Sleat). On 12 April 1893, he married Baroness Hilda von Alvensleben-Rusteberg. They later divorced and on 10 February 1904, he married secondly the Hon. Mary Eden, third daughter of the 4th Baron Auckland, and they had three children, Adam Duncan (1904–1965), John Julian (1906–1966), and (Mary Diana) Eve (1908–1997).

In 1911, Chetwynd inherited his uncle's titles. Between 1915 and 1919, he was managing director of the National Shell Filling Factory No. 6, Chilwell, Nottinghamshire, which he designed and built; for which he was a made a Companion of Honour for his services to the war effort.

References 

 Haslam, M.J. (Captain RAOC), (1982). The Chilwell Story: 1915 – 1982, VC Factory and Ordnance Depot. Nottingham: The RAOC Corps Gazette. .

1863 births
1936 deaths
Members of the Order of the Companions of Honour
Viscounts in the Peerage of Ireland